Microphycita titillella is a species of snout moth in the monotypic genus Microphycita. The species and the genus were described by Harrison Gray Dyar Jr. in 1914. It is found in Panama.

References

Moths described in 1914
Phycitinae